John Grace (born October 2, 1977) is a retired Canadian Football League linebacker.

College career
Grace attended Marshall University, and was a two-time Team Defensive MVP, a two-time All-MAC selection, and was the 1998 Motor City Bowl MVP. He finished his stellar college career with 15 sacks, and 437 tackles.

Professional career
Grace joined the CFL in 2000, playing 6 games for the Montreal Alouettes over 2 seasons. In 2002, he played for the Ottawa Renegades, and was an all star. After another season in Ottawa, he moved to the Calgary Stampeders, where he was an all star in 2004 and 2005, and won the CFL's Most Outstanding Defensive Player Award in 2005. After returning to Calgary in 2006, Grace was again signed as a free agent by the Montreal Alouettes during the off-season, and retired after the 2007 season when he was released by Montreal.

References

1977 births
Living people
American players of Canadian football
Canadian football linebackers
Calgary Stampeders players
Canadian Football League Most Outstanding Defensive Player Award winners
Marshall Thundering Herd football players
Montreal Alouettes players
Ottawa Renegades players
People from Okeechobee, Florida